Reichlin is a surname.  Notable people with the surname include:

Alfredo Reichlin (1925–2017), Italian journalist and politician
Bruno Reichlin (born 1941), Swiss architect
Karl Reichlin (1841–1924), Swiss politician
Lucrezia Reichlin (born 1954), Italian economist, daughter of Alfredo